Alvania canariensis is a species of minute sea snail, a marine gastropod or micromollusk in the family Rissoidae. The species has been found in the Canary Islands.

References

Rissoidae
Invertebrates of the Canary Islands
Gastropods described in 1840